The Academic All-America program is a student-athlete recognition program.  The program selects an honorary sports team composed of the most outstanding student-athletes of a specific season for positions in various sports—who in turn are given the honorific "Academic All-American".  Since 1952, CoSIDA has bestowed Academic All-American recognition on male and female athletes in Divisions I, II, and III of the National Collegiate Athletic Association (NCAA) as well as athletes in the NAIA, other U.S. four-year schools, two-year colleges, and Canadian universities, covering all championship sports. The award honors student-athletes who have performed well academically while regularly competing for their institution.

It is sponsored by and presented as the Google Cloud Academic All-America® Award, having been previously sponsored by Capital One (2011–18), ESPN The Magazine (2004–2010), Verizon (2000–04) and GTE (1985–2000), and is administered by the College Sports Information Directors of America (CoSIDA). The award was known as the CoSIDA Academic All-America until 1985. The phrases "Academic All-America" and "Academic All-American" are protected trademarks of CoSIDA.

Prior to 2011, there were two sets of teams chosen: One for Division I and one for all other Divisions, NAIA, two-year colleges and Canadian schools. In 2011, the program was expanded to include four sets of honorary teams: one for each of NCAA Divisions I, II and III as well as a "College Division" for NAIA, four-year U.S. schools that are not NCAA or NAIA members, two-year colleges and Canadian schools. The College Division was further split after the 2017–18 school year with the creation of a separate NAIA division. In each program, regional Academic All-District selections are made with the first-team All-District selections being eligible for Academic All-America team selections.

Details

Domain
Currently, CoSIDA is responsible for the annual selection of 816 Academic All-Americans in men's baseball, basketball, football, soccer, and track & field/cross country and women's basketball, soccer, softball, volleyball, and track & field/cross country, as well as at-large teams for both men and women in Division I, II and III, NAIA, and CoSIDA's College Division in all NCAA championship sports.  Currently, the sports that CoSIDA recognizes as eligible for at-large Academic All-American recognition are men's and women's golf, gymnastics, ice hockey, lacrosse, swimming and diving, tennis, and water polo; men's volleyball and wrestling; women's beach volleyball, bowling, field hockey, and rowing; and the coeducational sports of fencing, rifle, and skiing. Athletes in each sport are selected by their respective governing bodies (e.g. U.S. Track & Field and Cross Country Coaches Association for track and field, American Volleyball Coaches Association for volleyball and United States Intercollegiate Lacrosse Association for lacrosse)

On May 7, 2018, Google Cloud was announced as the title sponsor of the Academic All-America program. Capital One had become the previous named sponsor of the program on January 31, 2011. CoSIDA has registered a trademark for the name, "Academic All-America" which it uses for its student-athlete recognition program.  The Academic All-America program administered by CoSIDA is not related to such programs administered or sponsored by coaches' organizations.  As a result, cease and desist orders have been granted to protect the trademark at times.  Various sports that have similar programs have had to use names such as All-Academic to recognize scholar athletes.

Prior to the relationship with Capital One, the Academic All-American Award has had other named corporate sponsors such as ESPN, Verizon and Verizon's corporate predecessor GTE who were sponsors from 1985 until the mid-2000s. In 1981, the National Collegiate Athletic Association sponsored the program. From 1985 until the 1999–2000 academic year the honorees were called GTE All-Americans, but during the 2000–01 academic year they became known as Verizon All-Americans when Verizon acquired GTE.  Verizon continued to be the named sponsor through the 2003–04 academic year when they did not renew their rights. ESPN the Magazine became the sponsor during the 2004–05 academic year and remained sponsor until September 2010. Fall 2010 teams, continued to bear the ESPN sponsorship name.  Capital one took over the sponsorship in January 2011.

Process
Initially, team selections were composed of both a University Division, made up of Division I participants, and a College Division, made up of Division II, Division III, NAIA, and 2-year colleges. First, second and third team selections are made for both divisions in most Academic All-America programs. However, the football programs only select a first and second team.  The football University Division includes both Football Bowl Subdivision and Football Championship Subdivision. In 2011, the program was expanded to incorporate four sets of teams: Division I, Division II, Division III and a College Division that included all U.S. four-year institutions outside the NCAA, two-year colleges and Canadian schools. After the 2018 award cycle, the NAIA was spun off from the College Division, with the College Division now consisting of two-year schools, plus four-year schools in the U.S. and Canada that are not members of the NCAA or NAIA.

Nominations must be made on the CoSIDA website by a current dues-paying member with a CoSIDA-issued user name and password for the academic year at issue.  Formerly, nominations were made by pen and ink and then with typewritten nominations.  The CoSIDA members nominate student-athletes only from the academic institution that they are affiliated with.  The nominees must be a starter or important reserve with at least a 3.30 cumulative grade point average (on a 4.0 scale) at his/her current institution. Nominees must have participated in at least 50 percent of the team’s games at the position listed on the nomination form (where applicable). In baseball and softball, pitchers must have at least 10.0 innings pitched. Nominees are ineligible until the completion of one full calendar year at his/her current institution and attainment of sophomore athletic eligibility. Transfers, graduate students and two-year college graduates must have completed one full calendar year at the nominating institution to be eligible. Graduate school nominees must have a cumulative GPA of 3.30 or better both as an undergraduate and in graduate school. Except for at-large program, there are no limits in the number of athletes an institution may nominate. In the at-large program, nominations are limited to three per school per gender (a total of three men's at-large candidates and three women's at-large candidates). If an institution participates in both the college and the university divisions, it may nominate a total of three men and three women between the two divisions.

In each program, All-District selections are elected by the CoSIDA membership with the resulting first-team All-District selections advancing to the national ballot for Academic All-America team selections. The national ballot is cast by members of the Academic All-America Committee and the CoSIDA Board of Directors.  Each program also recognizes a single athlete for both the University and College Divisions who are referred to as Academic All-America of the Year.

In addition, there is an annual selection by the College Sports Information Directors of America and its Academic All-America sponsor of the individual athlete selected as the most outstanding Academic All-America of the approximately 1640 annual selections. Since the start of the 2018–19 school year, one winner has been chosen for each of five divisions: Division I, Division II, Division III, NAIA, and the College Division. From 2012 to 2018, the non-NCAA division was known as the College Division, and included NAIA members, two-year institutions, U.S. four-year schools that were not NCAA or NAIA members, and Canadian schools. Between 1996 and 2011 one winner each was chosen from both the College and University Divisions' 816 annual selections.  Between 1988 and 1995 one winner was chosen per year.

Team Member of the Year
See: List of Academic All-America Team Members of the Year
During the 1987–88 academic year, CoSIDA began selecting one student as the most outstanding team member of the year. In 1996, CoSIDA began selecting two outstanding team members yearly, one each from the College division and the University division. In 2011–12, when the program was expanded to include four sets of teams (Division I, Division II, Division III and a College Division), four winners were chosen, one from each division. Starting in 2018–19, a dedicated NAIA team was added.

See also
All-America
Walter Byers Award
Elite 90 Award

References

External links 
All-Sport archive 2002–present
CoSIDA Academic All-America All-Time List (.pdf)
CoSIDA Academic All-America performers: School overall totals and by Division/listings by sport/misc. categories (.pdf)

College sports in the United States
College sports trophies and awards in the United States
Aca
Awards established in 1952